Gregg Troy (born December 19, 1950) is an American professional and Olympic swimming coach. As of April 2021, he is the head coach for the Cali Condors, which is part of the International Swimming League. Until 2018, he was the head coach of the Florida Gators swimming and diving teams of the University of Florida. Previously, Troy served as an assistant coach for the U.S. Olympic men's swim team in 1996 and 2008, and he was the head coach of the 2012 U.S. Olympic men's swim team that competed at the 2012 Summer Olympics in London.

Early life and education 

Troy was born in Bellefonte, Pennsylvania, near State College, in 1950.  He earned a Bachelor of Arts degree in government from Texas Christian University in Fort Worth, Texas in 1972, and later earned a Master of Arts degree in history education from Jacksonville University in Jacksonville, Florida in 1987.

Coaching career 

Troy had been the head coach of the Florida Gators men's swimming and diving teams at the University of Florida in Gainesville, Florida from 1999, and the head coach of the Gators women's team from 1998.  Before he joined the Gators in 1998, he was the head coach of the swim teams of The Bolles School in Jacksonville, Florida, a position he held for twenty years.  During his tenure with Bolles, the prep school's swim teams became perennial state champions, winning fifteen boys team championships and eleven girls team championships.

He has served as a women's assistant coach at the 1996 Summer Olympics in Atlanta, Georgia, the men's head coach for the 1999 Pan American Games in Winnipeg, Manitoba, and the men's assistant head coach for the U.S. Olympic team at the 2008 Summer Olympics in Beijing, China.  In fourteen seasons with Gators women's squad and thirteen years with the Gators men's team, Troy has guided Gators swimmers to more than sixty SEC individual titles, more than 200 SEC Academic Honor Roll selections and more than 550 All-America honors.  In 2009, the Gators women's team won the SEC team championship; in 2010, they won the NCAA national team championship.

Troy has coached sixty-eight Olympians, and multiple world champions and world record holders, including most notably Ryan Lochte.  Coached by Troy, Lochte developed into a swimming force on the international level, winning eleven medals, including five gold medals in three Olympic Games, and holding multiple current world records and multiple current world championship titles.

In December 2010, the U.S. Olympic Committee appointed Troy to serve as the head coach of the U.S. men's swimming team for the 2012 Summer Olympics to be held in London, England.  Troy's men's Olympic team won a total of sixteen medals in seventeen events.

Career highlights 

• Golden Goggle Award for Coach of the Year (2021)
• U.S. Olympic team men's head coach (2012)
• U.S. Swimming Coach of the Year (2010)
• ASCA Coach of the Year (2010)
• NCAA Women's Swimming Coach of the Year (2010)
• SEC Men's Swimming Coach of the Year (2010)
• U.S. national team head coach for Pan Pacific Games (2010)
• U.S. Olympic team men's assistant coach (2008)
• SEC Men's Coach of the Year (2007)
• U.S. national team women's assistant coach for FINA World Short Course Championships (2004)
• NCAA Men's Coach of the Year (2004)
• NCAA Men's Coach of the Year (2002)
• SEC Men's Coach of the Year (2002)
• U.S. national team men's head coach for World Championships (2001)
• SEC Men's Coach of the Year (2000)
• U.S. national team men's head coach for Pan American Games (1999)
• U.S. national team women's head coach for World Championships (1998)
• U.S. Olympic & Swimming Developmental Coach of the Year (1997)
• U.S. Olympic team women's assistant coach (1996)
• U.S. national team head coach for Pan American Games (1995)
• Thailand Olympic team head coach (1992)
• Coached 68 Olympians
• Coached over 230 All-American swimmers
• Coached swimmers who set 155 U.S. and international records

Source for highlights:

Head coaching record

Women's swimming and diving

Men's swimming and diving

See also 

 Florida Gators
 History of the University of Florida
 List of Texas Christian University alumni
 List of University of Florida Olympians
 University Athletic Association

References

External links 
  Gregg Troy – University of Florida coach profile at GatorZone.com

1950 births
Living people
American Olympic coaches
American swimming coaches
Florida Gators swimming coaches
Jacksonville University alumni
People from Bellefonte, Pennsylvania
Texas Christian University alumni